SR Battle of Britain class 34073 249 Squadron is one of 20 surviving Bulleid light pacifics.  Built-in May 1948 as a British Railways-built example of a Southern Railway design, and named after the RAF's 249 Squadron, it remained in service until June 1964, after which it was ultimately sold the following year to Woodham Brothers Scrapyard. It awaited restoration at Ian Riley's workshop, Bury before moving into storage at Carnforth. It had over time given several parts to sibling 34067 Tangmere.

After withdrawal

After withdrawal, it was moved to Woodham Brothers scrapyard, Barry, (in South Wales) for scrapping. It remained there until February 1988 when it was moved to Brighton for the Brighton Railway Museum project at the Pullman works. The locomotive was stored at Ropley on the Mid Hants Railway for a number of years, while awaiting a decision about its restoration. Some time around May 2006 the locomotive left the Mid Hants in order to donate parts of its valve gear to sibling engine 34067 Tangmere (which had suffered a catastrophic failure while hauling a mainline excursion, causing its valve gear oil-bath to be punctured).

Current location
34073 249 Squadron is currently stored at Carnforth after being moved from Bury in 2014.  It is awaiting overhaul, possibly to join the WCRC fleet.

See also
 List of SR West Country and Battle of Britain class locomotives

References

External links

Photo of still-unrestored 34073, at Bury, 29 December 2009

West Country 34073
4-6-2 locomotives
Railway locomotives introduced in 1948
Locomotives saved from Woodham Brothers scrapyard